John Mullaly (1835–1915), known as father of the Bronx's park system, was a newspaper reporter and editor who was instrumental in forming the New York Park Association. He was born in Belfast, Ireland. After coming to the United States, he worked for the New York Herald, the New York Tribune, and the New York Evening Post.  He was the editor of the Metropolitan Record, published by the Catholic Church in New York City.

He held public office, including serving as the New York Commissioner of Health, and serving on the board of tax assessors.

In 1887, he published a book with the impressive title, New Parks beyond the Harlem with Thirty Illustrations and Map; Descriptions of Scenery; Nearly 4000 Acres of Free Playground for the People; Abundant space for a Parade Ground, a Rifle Range, Base Ball, Lacrosse, Polo, Tennis and all athletic games; picnic and excursion parties and nine mile of waterfront for bathing fishing, yachting and rowing.

War resister 
Mullaly was a controversial figure during the American Civil War, one of New York City's ardent opponents to the draft.  On August 19, 1864, John Mullaly was arrested for inciting resistance to the draft and examined a few days later for possible trial.

At a rally in Union Square on May 19, 1863, Mullaly declared the war to be “wicked, cruel and unnecessary, and carried on solely to benefit the negroes”, and advised resistance to conscription if ever the attempt should be made to enforce the law. As editor of the Metropolitan Record, Mullaly's call for armed resistance to the military draft led to his arrest following the July 1863 New York City Draft Riots.  Over one hundred people died, including Black men beaten to death or lynched by rioters, in the worst urban unrest in the United States during the 19th century.  A racist, Mullaly did not support the murder of Blacks during the rioting. In one Metropolitan Record editorial he advised members of the “superior” race not to turn their anger against an “inferior” one.

Editorials in the Metropolitan Record written by Mullaly leading up to the Draft Riots accused the Lincoln Administration of perverting the war from an attempt to restore the Union into an “emancipation crusade.”  He charged the “vile and infamous” Emancipation Proclamation would bring “massacre and rapine and outrage into the homes on Southern plantations, sprinkling their hearths with the blood of gentle women, helpless age, and innocent childhood.” According to Mullaly's diatribe, “Never was a blacker crime sought to be committed against nature, against humanity, against the holy precepts of Christianity.”

In the indictment, Mullaly was also charged with counseling Governor Seymour to “forcibly to resist an enrollment ordered by competent authority in pursuance of said act of Congress.” After a hearing, however, the case against Mullaly was discharged.

Developer of parks in The Bronx 

A biographer reports that after the Civil War Mullaly left the newspaper business and entered city government through connections with the corrupt Tweed Ring and Tammany Hall.  This led to his involvement with the annexation of property in the Bronx and the eventual creation of public parks.

In 1874 when New York City annexed the west Bronx from Westchester County, Mullally sought to create public parks in the Bronx, and founded the New York Park Association in 1881. His efforts culminated in the 1884 New Parks Act and the city's 1888-90 purchase of lands for Van Cortlandt, Claremont, Crotona, Bronx, St. Mary's, and Pelham Bay Parks and the Mosholu, Pelham and Crotona Parkways.

Mullaly Park in the south Bronx was named after him.

On June 16, 2021, after criticism and protests against Mullaly's racist rhetoric during the murderous New York City draft riots, the NYC Parks Department announced they would remove Mullaly's name.  It will instead honor Reverend Wendell T Foster who as a long-standing New York City Council Member was a champion of the park and the neighborhood.

References

External links 

 A Trip to Newfoundland: Its Scenery and Fisheries, by John Mullaly
 New York City Department of Parks & Recreation
 NY-NJ-CT Botany Online website, including a chronology.
 Critics Want Mullaly Park In The Bronx Renamed, Citing Namesake's Racist Rhetoric
 New York City renames 16 parks to honor Black American experience

1835 births
1915 deaths
Writers from New York City
New York City public officials
Journalists from Northern Ireland